Awaruite is a naturally occurring alloy of nickel and iron with a composition from Ni2Fe to Ni3Fe.

Awaruite occurs in river placer deposits derived from serpentinized peridotites and ophiolites. It also occurs as a rare component of meteorites. It occurs in association with native gold and magnetite in placers; with copper, heazlewoodite, pentlandite, violarite, chromite, and
millerite in peridotites; with kamacite, allabogdanite, schreibersite and graphite in meteorites.

It was first described in 1885 for an occurrence along Gorge River, near Awarua Bay, South Island, New Zealand, its type locality.

Awaruite is also known as josephinite in an occurrence in Josephine County, Oregon where it is found as placer nuggets in stream channels and masses in serpentinized portions of the Josephine peridotite. Some nuggets contain andradite garnet.

An occurrence of awaruite is being developed commercially as an ore mineral in a large low grade deposit in central British Columbia, some 90 km northwest of Fort St. James. In the deposit awaruite occurs disseminated in the Mount Sidney Williams ultramafic/ophiolite complex.

References

Native element minerals
Cubic minerals
Minerals in space group 221